The 1996–97 Midland Football Alliance season was the third in the history of Midland Football Alliance, a football competition in England.

Clubs and league table
The league featured 17 clubs from the previous season, along with three new clubs:
Bloxwich Town, promoted from the Midland Football Combination
Bridgnorth Town, relegated from the Southern Football League
Pelsall Villa, promoted from the West Midlands (Regional) League

League table

References

External links
 Midland Football Alliance

1996–97
8